Borja Herrera González (born 8 January 1993) is a Spanish professional footballer who plays as a defender or winger for Indian Super League club Hyderabad.

Club career
Born in Las Palmas, Canary Islands, Herrera finished his formation with AD Huracán. He made his debut as a senior with CF Unión Viera during the 2012–13 season, in Tercera División.

On 31 January 2014, Herrera joined CD Tudelano in Segunda División B. On 12 July 2014 he moved to UD Las Palmas, club he already represented as a youth, being assigned to the reserves also in the third division.

On 11 July 2016, Herrera extended his contract until 2018. The following 13 June, after helping the B-side in their promotion to the third division, he was definitely promoted to the main squad ahead of the 2017–18 campaign.

Herrera made his first team – and La Liga – debut on 24 September 2017, starting in a 0–2 home loss against CD Leganés. The following 25 January, he was loaned to Segunda División side Real Valladolid until June.

On 31 July 2018, after achieving promotion with the Blanquivioletas and suffering relegation with the Amarillos, Herrera signed a three-year deal with CF Reus Deportiu in the second level. He scored his first professional goal the following 6 January, netting the opener in a 3–0 away defeat of Málaga CF.

On 24 January 2019, Herrera left the Catalans due to the club's poor financial situation overall. Two days later, he agreed to an 18-month contract with fellow league team Albacete Balompié.

On 19 July 2019, Herrera signed a two-year contract with Maccabi Netanya from the Israeli Premier League.

On 6 August 2020, signed in Andorra.

Hyderabad
In July 2022, Herrera moved to India and signed with defending Indian Super League champions Hyderabad. He made his debut on 13th Oct, 2022 against NorthEast United. He came on as a substitute in the 71st minute, and immediately scored.

Career statistics

Club

References

External links

1993 births
Living people
Footballers from Las Palmas
Spanish footballers
Association football defenders
Association football wingers
La Liga players
Segunda División players
Segunda División B players
Tercera División players
CD Tudelano footballers
UD Las Palmas Atlético players
UD Las Palmas players
Real Valladolid players
CF Reus Deportiu players
Albacete Balompié players
FC Andorra players
Israeli Premier League players
Maccabi Netanya F.C. players
Spanish expatriate footballers
Spanish expatriate sportspeople in Israel
Spanish expatriate sportspeople in Andorra
Expatriate footballers in Israel
Expatriate footballers in Andorra